The Mandelin reagent is used as a simple spot-test to presumptively identify alkaloids as well as other compounds. It is composed of a mixture of ammonium metavanadate and concentrated sulfuric acid. Its primary use is for the detection of ketamine and PMA Unlike the most common reagent test chemicals, it has a deep red colour that changes to yellow if there is no alkaloid, which occurs within about 48 hours of mixing.

The United States Department of Justice method for producing the reagent is the addition of 100 mL of concentrated (95–98%) sulfuric acid to 0.5-1 g of Ammonium metavanadate.

This reagent was invented by the German pharmacologist, Karl Friedrich Mandelin (1854–1906) at the University of Dorpat.

See also
Drug checking
Dille–Koppanyi reagent
Folin's reagent
Froehde reagent
Liebermann reagent
Marquis reagent
Mecke reagent
Simon's reagent
 Zwikker reagent

References

Chemical tests
Analytical reagents
Drug testing reagents